Lavanya (born 1 December 1979) is an Indian actress who has appeared in Tamil films and serials. Lavanya rose to fame portraying supporting roles in Tamil films during the 1990s, before moving on to work in television in the 2000s.

Career
Lavanya studied at M. A. Krishnaswamy Higher Secondary School in Chennai and then Velankanni Matriculation Higher Secondary School in Hosur, Tamil Nadu before embarking on a career in films. Early notable roles she appeared in includes her character in K. S. Ravikumar's Padayappa (1999), where she played the wife of Nassar's character, Jodi (1999), Sethu (1999), Sangamam (1999) and Thenali (2000), where she portrayed an interviewer. She also did some roles as the lead actress, notably in the Malayalam film, Aram Indriyam (2001).  She subsequently went on to appear in over one hundred films, mainly in supporting roles. She has been as a supporting actress in Naan Than Bala (2014), a tale of Dharma's triumph over evil that has received mixed reviews from critics.

Lavanya moved into work in television roles and notably portrayed a princess in the historical drama series, Romapuri Pandian.

Selected filmography

References

External links

1979 births
Indian film actresses
Actresses in Tamil cinema
Living people
21st-century Indian actresses
Actresses in Malayalam cinema